ESC Reporter was an independent news website that focuses on the theme of the Eurovision Song Contest. Created in January 2013, the website was one of many in the long list of websites covering the Eurovision Song Contest.

In the fall of 2013, an interview with the Ukrainian singer Kamaliya was published in the newspaper Kyiv Post, one of the largest English-language newspapers in Ukraine. The interview was also featured on the official website of Kamaliya and translated into Ukrainian for the newspaper Pravda.
ESC Reporter was recognized by the EBU as an accredited news source.
Since its creation, ESC Reporter had interviewed many Eurovision participants, including Eldar Gasimov (Ell & Nikki - Azerbaijan 2012), Conchita Wurst (Austria 2014), Aram Mp3 (Armenia 2014), Mei Finegold (Israel 2014), and Ruth Lorenzo (Spain 2014).

References

External links 
 

Internet properties established in 2013
European news websites
Companies based in Copenhagen
American entertainment news websites